is a Japanese architect.

One of his first major notable works was a pickle shop in his native Kyoto in 1990, followed by Humax Pavilion in Tokyo's Shibuya. His 1995 design for the Rapi:t express train that links Osaka's Namba Station with Kansai International Airport won the Blue Ribbon Award. He has also designed Keihan Electric Railway's Uji Station (1995) and the Mainichi Shimbun offices in Kyoto (1999).

His work is exhibited internationally, notably at the Canadian Centre for Architecture in Montreal.

References

1949 births
Japanese architects
Living people